Unió Esportiva Vic, is a Spanish football team based in Vic, in Catalonia, Spain. Founded in 1922, it plays in Primera Catalana, holding home games at Estadi Hipòlit Planàs, with a capacity of 4,000 spectators.

History
Unió Esportiva Vic was founded in 1943, but its current date corresponds to the old club of the city: Vic Football Club (1922).

In 2010, UE Vic bought UE Aiguafreda's seat in Primera Catalana.

Season to season

24 seasons in Tercera División

References

External links
Official Website 
UE Vic Team Profile 

Football clubs in Catalonia
Association football clubs established in 1943
1943 establishments in Spain
Vic